Pedro Siochi was a Philippine architect and civil engineer of famous landmarks in the Philippines.

Background
Pedro Siochi y Angeles was a Japanese Filipino architect and civil engineer of famous landmarks and structures in the Philippines. He was born in 1886 in Manila, Captaincy General of the Philippines.

Education
Siochi attended the University of Ghent in Belgium. He later worked with the Philippine Bureau of Engineering and Construction.

Career

Pedro Siochi and Company
Siochi was the founder and owner of the architecture firm Pedro Siochi and Company, Inc.

Notable Works
Among the significant works of Pedro Siochi and Company are famous Philippine landmarks, namely:
 Talavera River Irrigation System in Bulacan Province (1923)
 Culasi Port in Roxas City (1926)
 Manila Central Post Office (1926) with Arch. Juan M. Arellano and Arch. Tomás Mapúa (1926)
 Legislative Building (1926) with Arch. Ralph Harrington Doane, Arch. Antonio Toledo, And Arch. Juan M. Arellano
 Manila Metropolitan Theater (1931) with Arch. Juan M. Arellano
 St. Cecilia's Hall of St. Scholastica's College (1932) with Arch. Andres Luna San Pedro
 Taal Vista Lodge in Laguna (1937–39) with Andres Luna de San Pedro
 Cebu Provincial Capitol (1938) with Juan M. Arellano
 Caliraya Dam in Laguna (1939)
 Santa Catalina College (1952).

Death
Siochi passed away in 1951 in Manila, the Philippines.

See also
 Manila Metropolitan Theater
 Manila Central Post Office
 Legislative Building
 Cebu Provincial Capitol
 Caliraya Dam

References 

1886 births
1951 deaths
Filipino people of Japanese descent